Cepolis is a genus of gastropods belonging to the family Cepolidae. 

The species of this genus are found in Southeastern Asia and Central America.

Species:
 Cepolis boriquenae H. B. Baker, 1940
Cepolis cepa 
Cepolis chocolata 
Cepolis crusta 
Cepolis cunctator 
 Cepolis dermatina (Shuttleworth, 1854)
Cepolis direpta 
Cepolis infissa 
Cepolis instrumosa 
Cepolis isomeroides 
Cepolis latebrosa 
Cepolis poeyi 
Cepolis squamosa 
Species brought into synonymy
 Cepolis definita Fulton, 1908: synonym of Cepolella definita (Fulton, 1908) (original combination)
[Cepolis hispaniolana : synonym of Cepolella hispaniolana (Clench, 1962) (superseded combination)
 Cepolis levibasis Vanatta, 1923: synonym of Cepolella definita (Fulton, 1908)
 Cepolis lincolni Bartsch, 1932: synonym of Cepolella trizonalis (Grateloup, 1840)
 Cepolis maynardi (Pilsbry, 1892): synonym of Plagioptycha maynardi (Pilsbry, 1892) (unaccepted combination)
 Cepolis musicola (Shuttleworth, 1854): synonym of Euclastaria musicola (Shuttleworth, 1854) (unaccepted combination)
 Cepolis pemphigodes (L. Pfeiffer, 1847): synonym of Cysticopsis pemphigodes (L. Pfeiffer, 1847) (superseded combination)
 Cepolis porcellana (Grateloup, 1840): synonym of Laevicepolis porcellana (Grateloup, 1840)
 Cepolis trizonalis (Grateloup, 1840): synonym of Cepolella trizonalis (Grateloup, 1840)
 Cepolis wetmorei Bartsch, 1932: synonym of Laevicepolis porcellana (Grateloup, 1840)

References

 Watters G.T. (2020). Review of the Hispaniolan land snail genus Cepolis Montfort, 1810 (Gastropoda: Helicoidea: Cepolidae). Novapex. 21(1): 1-15

External links
 Montfort P. [Denys de. (1808-1810). Conchyliologie systématique et classification méthodique des coquilles. Paris: Schoell.]

Cepolidae (gastropods)
Gastropod genera